"Tell Me Why" (stylised in all caps) is a song by Australian rapper the Kid Laroi, released on 17 July 2020  as the second single from his debut mixtape F*ck Love (2020). An accompanying music video was released on the same day. The song was produced by OkTanner, Pharaoh Vice, Rio Leyva, Taz Taylor and MJNichols, and is a tribute to American rapper Juice Wrld.

Composition
In the song, the Kid Laroi sings about his heartbreak of losing his friend and mentor, fellow rapper Juice Wrld, who died in December 2019. In emotional distress, he looks for answers and asks, "Tell me why, tell me why it's so hard to say goodbye" and "Watch all of my idols die, right in front of my eyes".

Charts

Certifications

References

2020 songs
2020 singles
The Kid Laroi songs
Songs written by Taz Taylor (record producer)
Songs written by the Kid Laroi
Columbia Records singles
Sony Music singles
Music videos directed by Cole Bennett